Hohlgangsanlage are a number of tunnels constructed in Jersey by occupying German forces during the occupation of Jersey. The Germans intended these bunkers to protect troops and equipment from aerial bombing and to act as fortifications in their own right.

The word Hohlgangsanlage can be translated as "cave passage installations". The Channel Island tunnels are the only ones on the Atlantic wall to be referred to as Hohlgangsanlagen.

All the tunnels except for Ho5 are incomplete, and some never progressed beyond planning. The partly complete tunnels are, nonetheless, substantial in size. Completed sections were used for various purposes such as storage.

In 1944, when construction stopped, 244,000 m3 of rock had been extracted for tunnel digging collectively from Guernsey, Jersey and Alderney (the majority from Jersey). At the same point in 1944, the entire Atlantic Wall from Norway to the Franco-Spanish border, excluding the Channel Islands, had extracted some 225,000 m3.

History 1941–present day
Tunnel construction began in 1941, shortly before Hitler's October 1941 decree that the islands be defended. The tunnels were constructed at strategic points around the island. Most of the tunnels were for shelter or storage, but some were used as part of and to link fortifications in strong points (such as at Corbière) and were part of casemates. The tunnels were constructed by the Festungsbaubataillone (fortress construction battalions),  4/Gesteinsbohr-Kompanie Btl. 77 (specialist mining battalion), the RAD (state labour for 17- and 18-year-olds) and the Organisation Todt. The Germans used a variety of labour sources, most being forced. After Todt's death in February 1942, Albert Speer drastically reduced the resources available for the construction of tunnels on the island. During 1944, there was a shortage of raw materials, so effort was diverted to finish only the most complete tunnels. On 9 May 1945, construction stopped with the liberation of Jersey.

Only a few tunnels were actually used by the Germans: Ho1, Ho4, Ho5, and Ho8; of these, only one was actually completed (Ho5) and the others were used while partially completed with unfinished galleries being walled off, or left with pit props in place.

Immediately after the war, the British used the tunnels: soon after the Liberation of the Channel Islands, some military equipment was moved and stored in the tunnels. For example, Ho1 stored weapons, Ho2 stored small equipment such as helmets, gas masks, fuel, oxyacetylene, and field kitchens. Ho13 stored Panzer Abteilung 213's Char B1 bis tanks.

During the 1950s scrap metal drive, the tunnels were mostly cleared and sealed. Under Jersey law, a landowner owns everything beneath his land, down to the centre of the earth, so all the tunnels are privately owned. Hohlgangsanlage 8 is the only tunnel open to the public without special permission from the land owner; it was opened to the public in 1946 by the British army, then gifted to the States of Jersey by the War Department. After a lawsuit by the owners of the land above, it became privately owned but still operates as a museum today.

Post 1962, all the tunnels were thoroughly cleared of German equipment (apart from the museum, Ho1 due to roof collapse and Ho4 due to masses of barbed wire, roof collapses and unexploded ordnance) after a tragedy in which two souvenir hunters died of carbon monoxide poisoning in Ho2.

The tunnels are very unstable as, contrary to popular belief, most were bored not into solid granite, but loose shale. This is evident from the large number of roof collapses in the incomplete, unlined tunnels. Most of the tunnels still survive today and are infrequently visited by organised parties (with permission).

There were plans to use some of the tunnels during the Swine flu pandemic; fortunately the pandemic never materialised.

Construction and design

The tunnels were dug into the sides of hills, into rock. This means that incomplete tunnels remain mostly intact, due to the strength of the unsupported rock. Completed sections are lined with concrete floors, walls, and ceilings.

There was a basic design of storage and personnel tunnel. Storage tunnels incorporated a  gauge railway in a loop running around the whole complex and a small platform for loading supplies; they usually had two entrances so that vehicles could continuously enter and exit the complex. Personnel tunnels were built like a grid; the railway was often removed after construction was complete.
Completed tunnels would have been lined in concrete, and have drainage, lighting, and air conditioning systems.

In all, 19–25 storage tunnels were planned but, due to the almost wholesale destruction of primary source material before the surrender, the exact number is unknown (although the number where work began is known).

Where possible, the tunnel routes avoided granite and instead they were routed through looser shale rock formations; this speeded up construction and was less labour-intensive, but it could also be dangerous due to an increased risk of rockfalls. The tunnels were dug by the traditional method of drilling and blasting. When the tunnels were bored out, they were lined with concrete. First, the floor was lined, followed by the walls, and, finally, the roof. The walls were concreted using wooden shuttering, the space between the shuttering and the rock face was filled with concrete, and the shuttering subsequently removed. The roof was made in the same way, but using curved shuttering balancing on the concrete walls. Concrete was poured down the escape shafts rather than through the tunnel entrances to avoid contamination with the rock leaving the tunnel; these chutes can still be seen in many of the tunnels.

Contrary to popular belief, there were relatively few accidents and deaths in the building programme itself, but many slave labourers died of starvation.

The tunnels

Storage Tunnels
Tunnels used only for storage
 Ho1 – Munitions store – West side of La Route d'Aleval – Incomplete but used, recently used as a mushroom farm
 Ho2 – Ration store – East side of La Route d'Aleval – Incomplete
 Ho3 – Munitions store – Planning stage only.
 Ho4 – Munitions store – West side of Grand Vaux Valley – Incomplete but used (now used by Jersey Water for storage).
 Ho5 – Fuel store – St. Aubin, Railway Walk – Complete, but used for munitions, now in use by the States of Jersey.
 Ho6 – Personnel shelter – L'Aleval, exact location unknown – Unknown if ever got past exploratory stage
 Ho7 – Artillery reserves – Cap Verd – Exploratory work only (rear entrance to Ho8 is also here)
 Ho8 – Artillery quarters – St Peter's Valley & Cap Verd – Incomplete but converted to hospital, and now a visitor attraction
 Ho9 – Electricity works – Bellozanne Valley – Planning stage only
 Ho10 – Ration store – Grands Vaux, between Mont Neron and Ruisseaux – Incomplete
 Ho11 – Personnel shelter – Planning stage only
 Ho12 – Fuel store – La Commune – Exploratory work only.
 Ho13 – Munition store – East side Beaumont Valley – Incomplete.
 Ho14 – Fuel store – Planning stage only.
 Ho15 – Store – West side of Beaumont Valley – Incomplete
 Ho16 – Personnel Shelter – West side of Beaumont Valley at road level – Incomplete, abandoned (not known if still in existence).
 Ho17 – Unknown – Unknown.
 Ho18 – Hospital – Westmount, disused mine/civilian air raid shelter – Planning Stage Only.
 Ho19 – Electricity works – first entrance from town La Folie, St Helier – Incomplete, used by States of Jersey.
 Ho20 – Tunnel- Mount Bingham – Incomplete
 Ho21 – Stores – Jubilee Hill – Planning Stage
 Ho22 – Stores – Rozel Valley – Planning Stage
 Ho23 – Personnel Shelter – Grouville Marsh – Planning Stage
 Ho24/25 – Greve de Lecq Valley/St. Ouen – Planning Stage

Railway Tunnels
Tunnels designed only for use as railway tunnels
 Eastern Railway Connecting tunnel – 2nd entrance at La Folie under Mt. Bingham – Incomplete, in use by JEC

Fortified Tunnels
Either stand alone or as part of emplacements
 Ho Etaquerel – Casemate complex – L'Etacq, St. Ouen – Completed
 Ho Mole Verclut – Casemate complex – Verclut Point (Gibraltar Rock) – Completed now in use by Jersey Turbot
 Stützpunkt Doktorhaus – Personnel Bunker with Machine Gun post – Mont Matthieu St. Ouen – Completed
 Stützpunkt Corbiere – Communications tunnel between bunkers – La Corbiere – Completed, bunkers open to the public by CIOS
 Batterie Derfflinger – Gun battery with accommodation – Le Mont de la Rocque, St. Brelade – completed
 Batterie Seydlitz – Gun battery with accommodation – Le Mont du Coin, St Brelade
 Batterie Moltke – Gun battery with tunnel system – Les Landes Common, St Ouen – completed, open to public by CIOS
 Batterie Schliefen – Small wood lined tunnel – Verclut, Grouville – lost

Associated with tunnels
Infrastructure used to support tunnels
 Stream Culvert – Beaumont Valley (used to protect stream from planned dumping of rubble)- intact visible from road
 Stone Crusher – L'Aleval, between Ho2 entrances – ruins
 Power Station – St Peter's Valley, Tesson Mill area – Main building and reservoir can be seen from road
 Queens Road Power Station – Queens Road – Used to supply electricity to the whole Island including tunnels (tunnels would also have backup generators)

See also
German occupation of the Channel Islands
Hohlgangsanlage 8
Atlantic Wall

References

External links

Channel Islands Occupation Society (Jersey Branch)
Official website of the Jersey War Tunnels

Tunnels in Jersey
World War II sites in the Channel Islands
Military history of the Channel Islands during World War II
History of Jersey
World War II sites of Nazi Germany
Nazi subterranea
German occupation of Jersey during World War II